Canard PC is an independent magazine founded in France in 2003 devoted to PC gaming and published monthly.

The title Canard PC is a paronym, derived from Canard WC, which is the French name for Toilet Duck.

Canard PCs independence from the game companies is recognized in the French video gaming circles.<ref>{{cite web
 | url=http://www.lesnumeriques.com/news_id-4626.html
 | title=CanardPC conteste notre test du 28 ViewSonic : un peu de débat !
 | publisher=lesnumeriques.com
 | date=2008-03-10
 | accessdate=2009-05-01}}</ref> Canard PC has a sister magazine, Canard PC Hardware.

Independent studies have shown that Canard PC reviews many games not mentioned by other magazines or websites specialized in video games, and has a strong variation in its review scores. Canard PC Managing editor, Ivan Gaudé, recognized in a video games critics panel on a French network that they did not like scoring very much, but they felt they had to put them for their reviews because gamers wanted them.

History
In July 2003, some editors left the publishing staff of the French gaming monthly Joystick after its acquisition by Future Publishing. They founded Canard PC in the following months. The magazine is edited by Presse Non-Stop'', a company owned at 75% by the editors themselves, specifically created for Canard PC.

References

External links
 website

2003 establishments in France
Bi-monthly magazines published in France
Computer magazines published in France
French-language magazines
Video game magazines published in France
Home computer magazines
Magazines established in 2003
Magazines published in Paris